Trinity College, previously known as Trinity College Gawler, is an Anglican, K-12, co-educational, day school in the northern suburbs of Adelaide, South Australia.

It was established in 1984. Trinity College caters for approximately 4,000 students over five schools:

 Trinity College Senior (Evanston South) 
 Trinity College Blakeview (Blakeview) 
 Trinity College Gawler River (Angle Vale) with an Early Learning Centre 
 Trinity College North (Evanston South) 
 Trinity College South (Evanston South) with a Montessori preschool.

Trinity College will open a sixth school at Roseworthy as part of the St Yves land development in 2024.

Students from the College have been successful in the Rock Eisteddfod Challenge (3rd in the small school section in 2004), the Tournament of Minds (2003 Secondary Division in Maths Engineering) and the Wakakirri competition, with Gawler River earning a 1st place in the division one section for new schools and South receiving 1st in the division three section. Trinity College is also home to the BaCoNeers, a FIRST Tech Challenge robotics team.

History 

Trinity College was formed at St Georges Church, Church Hill, Gawler, when a group of parish parents wanted a better place for their children to learn. The first class was held in the parish hall, before moving to its now current location in Evanston South. In 1994, the college purchased 2.16 square kilometres of bushland and created the Blackham Environmental and Conservation Centre.

In 1995 the Trinity College Foundation was formed with a Board of 11 volunteer members and became incorporated in 1996. 

STARplex is a business adjacent to the senior campus, owned and operated by Trinity College. Opened in 2000, the centre has four multi-purpose courts, one 25m and one small indoor heated swimming pools, gymnasium, café, theatre, and conference rooms. The facility offers sports, training, arts and recreational services.

The "Trinity Innovation and Creativity School" was opened in early 2020 and contains an art gallery, podcast studios, green rooms, 360 degree projection room, multiple classrooms, design studios and a sunken gallery with a large screen. In 2021 it was announced the school would be teaching students to create VR content as a partner in a project with Pembroke and SEDA College, with the schools working with Newcastle University to run a year-long trial in VR content creation. 

The College plans to open a sixth school at Roseworthy in 2024.

Alumni 

 Travis Head (2011) - cricketer
 Wes Carr (1999) - singer/songwriter
 Glenn Docherty (2001) - Mayor of City of Playford, Australia
 Brad Symes (2001) - footballer
 Ryan Harris (1997) - former cricketer
 Paul Benz (2003) - Paralympic athlete
 Chelsea Jaensch (2002) - track and field athlete
 Wayne Milera (2015) - footballer
 Jackson Hately (2018) - footballer
 Kristian Rees (1996) - footballer
 Clementine Ford (1998) - writer

Criticism 

In 2021 an incident of alleged racism occurred involving two Trinity College Senior schoolgirls, who were reported to have lynched a black baby doll.  A white doll was also mistreated. Although an investigation by the school found the incident to not be racially motivated, the school acknowledged that "not having a racist intent does not mean the impact is not racist" and suspended seven students over the incident.

Headmasters 

 Mrs Christina Hatchett – 1984
 Mr Michael Hewitson – 1984 to 2002
 Mr Luke Thompson – 2002 to 2010
 Mr Nick Hately – 2010 to current

Schools 
Current:
Evanston South (Gawler)
 Trinity College Montessori Early Learning Centre 3 – 5 years of age
Trinity College North, Reception – Year 10
Trinity College South, Reception – Year 10
Trinity College Senior, Year 11 – 12
 Blakeview (City of Playford)
 Trinity College Blakeview, Reception – Year 10
 Angle Vale (City of Playford)
Trinity College Gawler River, Reception – Year 10
Trinity College Montessori Early Learning Centre at Gawler River
Planned:
Roseworthy (Light Regional Council)
 Trinity College Roseworthy (planned opening 2024)

Extracurricular Offerings 
Trinity College offers the following extracurricular activities to its students:

See also 
 Anglican Church of Australia
 List of schools in South Australia
 List of Largest South Australian Schools

References

External links 
 

Anglican primary schools in Adelaide
Anglican secondary schools in Adelaide
Rock Eisteddfod Challenge participants
Educational institutions established in 1984
Junior School Heads Association of Australia Member Schools
1984 establishments in Australia
Gawler, South Australia